Pyaar Tune Kya Kiya is a 2001 Indian Hindi-language romantic thriller film produced by Ram Gopal Varma, and directed by Rajat Mukherjee. It stars Fardeen Khan, Urmila Matondkar and Sonali Kulkarni. The soundtrack was composed by Sandeep Chowta. The film, which marked Mukherjee's directorial debut, is mainly known for Matondkar's remarkable performance as an obsessed lover. It served as the remake of the film Fatal Attraction, and was commercially successful

Plot
Ria (Urmila Matondkar) is a headstrong loner angry woman and the only daughter of a rich businessman in Mumbai, Mr Jaiswal (Suresh Oberoi). Jaiswal loves his daughter but is concerned about her possessive nature. One day Ria sets out for a vacation in Goa. Jai (Fardeen Khan) is a fashion photographer, happily married to Geeta (Sonali Kulkarni). He meets Ria and takes photos of her without permission and publishes them in the magazine he works for. The magazine becomes a hit because of the pictures. The chief editor wants Ria to model for their magazine but she refuses because she is angry at Jai for publishing her pictures without asking her. Jai manages to convince her to model and she falls in love with him. She wants to talk to Jai about marriage but when she visits his home, she is shocked to meet Geeta. Shaken and distraught, Ria slips into depression.

Ria confesses her feelings to Jai, who is startled. Seeing her weeping so much, he tells her that he would have accepted her love if not married. Jai tells Geeta everything and vows to stay away from Ria. However, Ria starts to get possessive about Jai, unable to forget him. She makes a suicide attempt and calls him in the middle of the night. Jai has no choice but to save and console her. This troubles Geeta and she tells Jai to file a police complaint. Jai and Geeta mend their relationship and go out on a date but that same night, Ria breaks down and Jai consoles her again. This angers Geeta even more.

Jai attends a company party with Geeta, not knowing that Ria has also been invited. Ria now wants Jai at any cost and flirts with him in front of Geeta, who leaves fuming. At home, Jai and Geeta have a huge argument and Geeta leaves in anger. She realizes her mistake and decides to go back but Ria breaks in and starts getting intimate with Jai. Geeta enters the house and loses control on seeing them. She accidentally falls onto a glass table and hurts her head. Jai takes her to the hospital.

Ria tells Geeta that she should leave the marriage and let her and Jai live happily. Geeta explains that Jai does not love Ria as she so thinks and nothing can break their relationship. Jai decides to leave the city because of Ria's obsessive nature. Ria calls, asking to meet one last time. Jai agrees but instead goes to meet Mr Jaiswal and tells him the truth. Jai calls Geeta and hears her being attacked by someone.

It's Ria, who has become completely unstable. She attempts to kill Geeta so that she can win Jai's love. Geeta tries to escape but fails. Just as Ria is about to kill her, Jai arrives. He pleads with her to let Geeta go and he will leave Geeta to be with her. Ria, convinced, runs toward Jai but he slaps her hard, making her unconscious. Mr Jaiswal arrives and Jai tells him what Ria did.

Six months later, Geeta and Jai are happy with their life once again while Ria is housed at a mental hospital. Her father arrives at Jai's house, asking him to meet her one last time as it's her birthday and it's only Jai that can make any impact on her. Jai agrees. Upon seeing Jai, Ria loses control and shakes him until her father and the hospital crew pull her away. Jai is left feeling guilty at Ria's mental condition.

Cast
Urmila Matondkar as Ria Jaiswal  
Fardeen Khan as Jai Bhatt, Geeta's husband.  
Sonali Kulkarni as Geeta Bhatt, Jai's wife.
Suresh Oberoi as Mr. Jaiswal, Ria's father.
Achint Kaur as Ria's mother
Rajpal Yadav as Rampal Yadav / Chhota Vakeel
Ravi Baswani as Vispy
Gautami Kapoor Mrs. Jaiswal

Soundtrack
The music and background score was composed by Sandeep Chowta.The song "Roundhe" is copied from Bram Stoker's Dracula theme whereas the title track has been copied from The Exorcist:2 theme. The film's soundtrack was one of the most successful to come out from that year. 
"Kambhkht Ishq" and the title track became a rage among the youth. "Kambhkht Ishq" took its entire musical structure from the Afro Celt Sound System song "Eireann" without any credit to them. For one of the songs "Mujhko Khuda Ne De Diya" Sandeep Chowta reused his own cult hit "Devudu Karunisthadani" from Telugu film Prema Katha.

Reviews
The film received mixed to positive reviews with Matondkar's performance being praised the most. Taran Adarsh from Bollywood Hungama wrote "the 'actual hero' of the film is definitely Urmila Matondkar, who will walk away with all laurels at the end of the day. Her career-best performance, she oozes intensity, love, hate, relentlessness and obsessive behaviour with perfection. And despite the fact that her character gets nuttier as the movie tags along, it is to Urmila's credit that we are able to feel for her pathetic persona. Screen gave it a positive review.

References

External links

Films scored by Sandeep Chowta
2001 films
2000s Hindi-language films
Indian romantic thriller films
Hindi films remade in other languages
2001 directorial debut films
2000s romantic thriller films